Cleome arenitensis is a species of plant in the Cleomaceae family and is found in Western Australia.

It is found in a small area along the coast in the Kimberley region of Western Australia.

References

arenitensis
Plants described in 2010
Flora of Western Australia